The Lehigh and Northampton Transportation Authority (LANTA; stylized as 'LANta') is a transit agency that provides public, fixed-route bus service throughout the Lehigh Valley region of eastern Pennsylvania, including the cities of Allentown, Bethlehem, and Easton.

History 
LANta was created in March 1972 in response to meet growing public transportation needs in Lehigh and Northampton. The solution was to create a bi-county, municipal Authority that would operate all public transit services in the two counties. Lehigh Valley Transit Company, a private for-profit entity, formally operated transit services in the Valley. LANta is governed by the Lehigh and Northampton Transportation Authority (LANys), which has ten voting and two non-voting members appointed by county executives.

In 1973, the Authority replaced the entire 65-vehicle fleet with modern air-conditioned transit coaches.  In 1974, LANTA added 30% more service hours and established a peak/off-peak fare structure offering discounts in the off-peak hours and Saturdays to encourage ridership.  Seniors, through a state lottery funded program, were offered free fare access during off-peak hours and weekends in 1975.

The Authority's main service is in the urbanized area of Allentown, Bethlehem, and Easton and surrounding Lehigh Valley boroughs and townships. About 380,000 people live within 3/4 mile of a fixed-route bus line. About 15,000 trips are taken daily on the metro city transit system.

In 1985, as the Lehigh Valley transformed from a manufacturing-based economy to a more service and retail-based economy, LANTA was completely revamped, and a new "Metro" system was introduced.  This included a color-coded route information system to make riding transit more 'user-friendly.'  The following year, 'deep-discount' fares were introduced as LANTA raised the case fares but kept ticket and pass prices the same and providing frequent riders with a 25% discount.

In 1988. Metro Plus services for the elderly and people with disabilities were introduced.  Fully accessible vans are available through contracts with private operators to take people to destinations door-to-door for a higher, zoned fare.

On October 21, 2001, LANTA started offering Sunday bus service to further increase access to public transit. The Authority is funded through revenues from the farebox; a grant from the Pennsylvania Lottery program with revenue generated by rides taken on the system by seniors 65 and older, grants from Lehigh and Northampton counties, the Pennsylvania Department of Transportation and the Federal Transit Administration. Combined these grants pay approximately 60% of the cost of operation; the remaining funds come through the lottery program and passenger fares.

About 2,000 trips are taken each weekday on the Metro Plus paratransit system. A transportation center was established in Bethlehem and centers in Allentown and Easton are under consideration.

The agency has grown in more recent years, adding more and more bus routes throughout the Lehigh Valley. Ridership has grown 75% since LANTA's inception. LANta was formerly involved with The Slater Express Van, Silverline Express, and The Bethlehem Loop.

The New LANta 

A new LANtaBus system was introduced in August 2011 that changed the route naming scheme from a letters to one-to-three digits. Routes are broken down into 6 categories (Corresponding to the first digit of the line number) and further broken down into specific routes after that (corresponding to the second and third digit). For example, LANtaBus route 108 is a "trunk" route that offers service from Fountain Hill to the Bethlehem Square Shopping center. LANtaBus route 410 provides service for the Allentown School District and only operates during the school year. New bus stop signs were also introduced throughout the system that lists the routes that operate at the stop (as compared to the old signs that only displayed a picture of a bus and the words "Lanta Metro").

Operations 

LANTA has three operating divisions:

LANtaBus (formerly Metro): The main transit service that is made up of 28 core, fixed bus routes in the Lehigh Valley. Special service routes add another 17 routes to the total.
LANtaVan (formerly Metro Plus): A special door-to-door paratransit service for people with disabilities and the elderly.
Carbon Transit (CT): A service the Authority agreed to manage in 1996 for Carbon County. Shared ride van services and two fixed-route bus lines comprise the Carbon Transit service.

LANTA is also involved with the 400 Routes, which provide school service in Allentown.

Eighty buses are in the LANtaBus city transit fleet; 118 vans are used to provide the LANtaVan door-to-door van services.  The Authority owns all vehicles. LANTA has two operating facilities: the main office, garage and maintenance building is at 1060 Lehigh Street in Allentown, nd there is a satellite facility located at 3610 Nicholas Street in Easton.

Routes 
LANta previously operated 35 fixed bus routes in its Metro service. Seventeen LANta routes serve the inner city areas of the Lehigh Valley, while five numbered routes serve the surrounding areas. Two shuttles named "The Rover" and "The Whirlybird", that operate from the Lehigh Valley Mall and Palmer Park Malls to various neighboring shopping strips and centers, serve as the final daily fixed routes. In the evening, LANTA operates the Starlight service made of seven fixed routes which services center city Allentown, the Lehigh Valley Mall, Palmer Park Mall, Whitehall, and Emmaus. There is also the Night Owl service that runs late-night from center city Allentown to Lehigh Valley Hospital–Cedar Crest. Metro also operates the Silverline Express which is an express bus that serves the Allentown, Bethlehem and Easton areas via Route 22 and the Bethlehem Loop, which serves as a shuttle for Bethlehem's downtown.

The new LANta comprises 28 routes that operate throughout the Lehigh Valley and 12 additional routes that operate during the school year for the Allentown School District. Routes with numbers in the 100s are trunk route" and offer the largest operating schedules for the entire week. The 200s routes operate through suburban corridors Monday through Saturday during the day. The 300s routes operate mainly in suburban corridors Monday through Friday during the day. The 400s routes are reserved exclusively for the Allentown School District. The 500s routes are reservation-based lines for suburban areas like Macungie. Finally, the 600s routes are designed to address the needs of certain markets, and include the Whirlybird line and the Bethlehem LOOP.

List of LANtaBus Routes

List of LANtaFlex Routes

List of Other Services

Fleet

References

External links 

LANTA Official Website

Bus transportation in Pennsylvania
Municipal authorities in Pennsylvania
Organizations established in 1972
Transportation in Allentown, Pennsylvania
Transportation in Lehigh County, Pennsylvania
Transportation in Northampton County, Pennsylvania